In taxonomy, inclusion is the process whereby two species that were believed to be distinct are found in fact to be the same and are thus combined as one species. Which name is kept for this unified species is sometimes a cause of debate, but generally it is the earlier-named one, and the other species is said to be "included" within this one.

Inclusion is far more common in paleontology than more recent biology, although it is not unheard of in the latter. When it occurs with more recent or modern species, it is usually the result of a species with wide geographical dispersion.

References 

Taxonomy (biology)